Oteležani (Cyrillic: Отележани) is a village in the eastern municipality of Konjic, Bosnia and Herzegovina.

Demographics 
According to the 2013 census, its population was 152, all Bosniaks.

References

Populated places in Konjic